The American School for the Deaf (ASD), originally The American Asylum, At Hartford, For The Education And Instruction Of The Deaf, is the oldest permanent school for the deaf in the United States, and the first school for children with disabilities anywhere in the western hemisphere. It was founded April 15, 1817, in West Hartford, Connecticut, by Thomas Hopkins Gallaudet, Dr. Mason Cogswell, and Laurent Clerc and became a state-supported school later that year.

History
The first deaf school in the United States was short-lived: established in 1815 by Col. William Bolling of Goochland, Virginia, in nearby Cobbs, with John Braidwood (tutor of Bolling's two deaf children) as teacher, it closed in the fall of 1816.

During the winter of 1818–1819, the American School for the Deaf became the first school of primary and secondary education to receive aid from the federal government when it was granted $300,000. As a result of its pivotal role in American deaf history, it also hosts a museum containing numerous rare and old items. While it is situated on a  campus, the ASD has a small enrollment — in its history, the ASD has graduated approximately 6000 graduates.

The impetus behind its founding was the fact that Alice Cogswell, the daughter of a wealthy local surgeon (Mason Fitch Cogswell), was deafened in childhood by fever at a time when the British schools were an unacceptable substitute for a local school. Dr. Cogswell prevailed upon the young Gallaudet (who had recently graduated from Yale University's School of Divinity and had begun studying at Andover). Gallaudet met young Alice in Hartford, where he was recovering from a chronic illness.

Cogswell and nine other citizens decided that the known 84 deaf children in New England needed appropriate facilities. However, competent teachers could not be found, so they sent Gallaudet in 1815 on a tour of Europe, where deaf education was a much more developed art. After being rebuffed by the Braidwoods, Gallaudet turned to the Parisian French schoolteachers of the famous school for the Deaf in Paris, where he successfully recruited Laurent Clerc.

On the strength of Clerc's reputation, the ASD was incorporated as the "Connecticut Asylum for the Education of Deaf and Dumb Persons," as it was originally known, in May 1816. When it opened in 1817, there were seven students enrolled: Alice Cogswell, George Loring, Wilson Whiton, Abigail Dillingham, Otis Waters, John Brewster, and Nancy Orr. The original name of the school was:  The Connecticut Asylum (at Hartford) for the Education and Instruction of Deaf and Dumb Persons. John Brewster Jr., was a 51-year-old itinerant portrait painter.

Gallaudet was principal until 1830. His son followed in his legacy, establishing Gallaudet University, which followed the ASD's lead and taught students primarily in American Sign Language (derived from the methodical signs and Parisian sign language of the French Institute for the Deaf).

In 2021, the ASD launched its "Online Academy" for students ages 12–16, which is the first virtual enrollment option offered by the school. The program is intended to provide services to students in other parts of the U.S. as well as international students. It also enrolls homeschooling students and hearing students who want to learn American Sign Language.

Athletics

The school is part of NEPSAC

 Fall: Soccer and Volleyball
 Winter: Basketball and Cheerleader
 Spring: Track and field and Softball

Camp Isola Bella
Isola Bella is ASD's summer camp for Deaf and Hard of Hearing children located in northwestern Connecticut near Salisbury on an island on Lake Washining. It was established in 1964, after a will of the island from ASD trustees Ferrari and Muriel Ward. There are two sessions, session 1 for ages 8–12 and session 2 for 13–18.

National Theater of the Deaf
In 2004, America's National Theatre of the Deaf (NTD) moved its corporate headquarters to the campus of the American School for the Deaf.

Notable alumni

 Edmund Booth helped establish the Iowa School for the Deaf.
 John Flournoy helped establish the Georgia School for the Deaf.
 Florence Lewis May (1916), art historian
 John Brewster, Jr painter and at age 51 the oldest student of the school's first class.
 Alice Cogswell, inspiration for the school's founding
 Julia Brace
 John Burton Hotchkiss, first deaf professor at Gallaudet University

References

External links

 
 History page on the ASD website
 Camp Isola Bella on the ASD website
 ASD 2017 Exhibit 
 "A Brief History Of The American Asylum, At Hartford, For The Education And Instruction Of The Deaf And Dumb"
 Third Report of the Directors and Officers 1819
 Fourth Report of the Directors and Officers 1820
 Fifth Report of the Directors and Officers 1821
 Eighth Report of the Directors and Officers 1824
 Fourteenth Report of the Directors and Officers 1830
 Fifteenth Report of the Directors and Officers 1831
 Eighteenth Report of the Directors and Officers 1834
 Nineteenth Report of the Directors and Officers 1835
 Twentieth Report of the Directors and Officers 1836
 Twenty-second Report of the Directors and Officers 1838
 Twenty-third Report of the Directors and Officers 1839
 Twenty-fifth Report of the Directors and Officers 1841
 Twenty-sixth Report of the Directors and Officers 1842
 Twenty-seventh Report of the Directors and Officers 1843
 Twenty-ninth Report of the Directors and Officers 1845
 Thirtieth Report of the Directors and Officers 1846
 Thirty-second Report of the Directors and Officers 1848
 Forty-first Report of the Directors and Officers 1857
 Forty-second Report of the Directors and Officers 1858
 Fifty-fourth Report of the Directors and Officers 1870
 Fifty-fifth Report of the Directors and Officers 1871

Schools for the deaf in the United States
Private elementary schools in Connecticut
Schools in Hartford County, Connecticut
Educational institutions established in 1817
Buildings and structures in West Hartford, Connecticut
Private high schools in Connecticut
Deaf culture in the United States
Private middle schools in Connecticut
Private K-12 schools in the United States
Schools in Connecticut
1817 establishments in Connecticut